Shah Mansur, also named Shah Mansoor or Shahmansoor, is a town and Union Council of Swabi District in Khyber-Pakhtunkhwa province of Pakistan. It is located at 34°4'0N 72°27'0E with an altitude of 301 metres (990 feet).

Overview
Shah Mansoor is a central town of Swabi district with a rich history. The district headquarters offices, which include the Judicial Complex, district headquarters Hospital, Police headquarters, EDO, DCO and other main offices, are shifted to Shah Mansur. It has increased the significance of the Shah Mansoor Township project which is expected to revolutionize the area. It holds a central position in the entire Pakhtunkhwa region for being one of the great seat of learning.

Majority of the youth of Shahmansoor work abroad in different countries including the GCC and Central Europe. Although a lot of workforce is still involved with local businesses and occupations including agriculture.

References

Populated places in Swabi District